NLnet Labs is a network research laboratory founded in Amsterdam in 1999 by the board members of NLnet. They develop DNS-related software, such as NSD, Unbound, OpenDNSSEC and getDNS.

History 
The roots of NLnet Labs have their origins in the NLnet Foundation. NLnet's core business is to support independent organisations and people that contribute to an open information society. For long term research projects, NLnet Labs was founded in 1999 by the board members of NLnet and Ted Lindgreen. One of the first activities was creating an implementation for DNSSEC. In 2001 the RIPE NCC asked NLnet Labs to write a DNS implementation geared especially to rootservers, but not containing any code of existing software. This marked the start of the development of NSD, the authoritative nameserver package.

Other major projects include a validating caching resolver Unbound, and the OpenDNSSEC project.

External links

References 

Research institutes in the Netherlands